That's My Wife is a 1933 British comedy film directed by Leslie S. Hiscott and starring Claud Allister, Frank Pettingell, Betty Astell and Davy Burnaby.

It was made as a quota quickie at Beaconsfield Studios. The film's art direction was by Norman G. Arnold.

Cast
 Claud Allister as Archie Trevor
 Frank Pettingell as Josiah Crump
 Betty Astell as Lillian Harbottle
 Davy Burnaby as Major Harbottle 
 Helga Moray as Queenie Sleeman 
 Hal Walters as Bertie Griggs 
 Thomas Weguelin as Mr. Sleeman
 Jack Vyvian as Sam Griggs

References

Bibliography
 Low, Rachael. Filmmaking in 1930s Britain. George Allen & Unwin, 1985.
 Wood, Linda. British Films, 1927-1939. British Film Institute, 1986.

External links
 

1933 films
1933 comedy films
1930s English-language films
Films directed by Leslie S. Hiscott
British comedy films
Quota quickies
Films shot at Beaconsfield Studios
British black-and-white films
1930s British films